Sowminak (also Romanized as Sowmīnak, Samīnak, Samaink, Simank, Smainak, Someynak, and Sormīnak) is a village in Ramand-e Jonubi Rural District, Ramand District, Buin Zahra County, Qazvin Province, Iran. At the 2006 census, its population was 211, in 46 families.

References 

Populated places in Buin Zahra County